Andrey Stanislavovich Barbashinsky (born May 4, 1970 in Ashmyany, Hrodna Voblast) is a Belarusian former handball player who competed for the Unified Team in the 1992 Summer Olympics.

In 1992 he won the gold medal with the Unified Team. He played all seven matches and scored 19 goals.

External links
profile

1970 births
Living people
People from Ashmyany
Belarusian male handball players
Olympic handball players of the Unified Team
Soviet male handball players
Handball players at the 1992 Summer Olympics
Olympic gold medalists for the Unified Team
Olympic medalists in handball
Medalists at the 1992 Summer Olympics
Honoured Masters of Sport of the USSR
Sportspeople from Grodno Region